The Newton Arboretum and Botanical Gardens is a 6-acre arboretum and botanical gardens located within Agnes Patterson Park, in Newton, Iowa.

The gardens include demonstration beds including three annual beds, a mixed perennial bed, an ornamental grass bed, a rose bed, two woody shrub beds, a shade garden, a tulip bed, a rose bed, a butterfly garden, a water garden, and a native prairie.

External links
Newton Arboretum

See also 
 List of botanical gardens in the United States

Arboreta in Iowa
Botanical gardens in Iowa
Protected areas of Jasper County, Iowa